Keat Hwa High School is a private Chinese high school in Alor Setar, Kedah, Malaysia. It is one of 60 Chinese independent high schools in Malaysia.

Keat Hwa High School is part of the Keat Hwa Family which consists of Keat Hwa Secondary School and Keat Hwa II Secondary School.

Keat Hwa High School is a private Chinese high school and should not be confused with the other two conforming Chinese high schools - the Keat Hwa Secondary School and the Keat Hwa II Secondary School

See also
 Keat Hwa Centennial Celebrations
 Keat Hwa Secondary School
 Keat Hwa II Secondary School

References

External links
 

Alor Setar
Keat Hwa Education Group
Chinese-language schools in Malaysia
Secondary schools in Malaysia